The 2007 Colgate Raiders football team was an American football team that represented Colgate University during the 2007 NCAA Division I FCS football season. Colgate tied for second in the Patriot League.

In its 12th season under head coach Dick Biddle, the team compiled a 7–4 record. Mike Gallihugh, Pat Nolan and Cody Williams were the team captains. 

The Raiders outscored opponents 283 to 239. Colgate's 4–2 conference record tied with Holy Cross and Lafayette for second in the Patriot League standings.

Colgate played its home games at Andy Kerr Stadium in Hamilton, New York.

Schedule

References

Colgate
Colgate Raiders football seasons
Colgate Raiders football